Francesco Magini (Fano, between 1668 and 1670–1714) was a minor Italian composer active in Rome in the first decade of the eighteenth century.

Recordings
 Aria Da che vide il tuo sembiante, Maite Beaumont

References

Italian Baroque composers
17th-century births
1714 deaths
18th-century Italian composers
18th-century Italian male musicians
Italian male classical composers